Holy Roadside is the second studio album by Australian rock and pop band The Badloves. The album was released in October 1995, peaked at number 14 and was certified gold.

At the ARIA Music Awards of 1996, the album earned The Badloves a nomination for ARIA Award for Best Group and Doug Roberts for Producer of the Year.

Track listing

Charts

Certification

Release history

References

1995 albums
The Badloves albums
Mushroom Records albums